Enteromius lamani is a species of ray-finned fish in the genus Enteromius which has been recorded from a single location in the Democratic Republic of the Congo.

References 

 

Enteromius
Taxa named by Einar Lönnberg
Taxa named by Carl Hialmar Rendahl
Fish described in 1920
Endemic fauna of the Democratic Republic of the Congo